John Buchanan (1819–1892) was a nineteenth-century Member of Parliament from the Hawke's Bay region of New Zealand.

References

1819 births
1892 deaths
Members of the New Zealand House of Representatives
New Zealand MPs for North Island electorates
Independent MPs of New Zealand
19th-century New Zealand politicians